Cabrero or Cabreros may refer to:
 Cabrero, Chile, a commune in the Bío Bío Province, Bío Bío Region, Chile
 Cabrero, Cáceres, a municipality of Cáceres province, autonomous community of Extremadura, Spain
 Cabreros del Monte, a municipality of Valladolid province, Castile and León, Spain
 Cabreros del Río, a municipality located of León province, Castile and León, Spain

People with the surname
 Andrés Cabrero (born 1989), Puerto Rican footballer
 Enrique Cabrero (born 1956), Mexican scientist and administrator
 Jesús Cabrero (born 1981), Spanish footballer
 José Daniel Barquero Cabrero (born 1966), Spanish businessman and teacher
 Juan Ramón Cabrero (born 1980), Spanish footballer
 Ramón Cabrero (1947–2017), Spanish-Argentine footballer
 Saúl García Cabrero (born 1994), Spanish footballer

Animals
 Western spindalis, Caribbean bird

See also
 Cabrera (disambiguation)